The United States District Court for the Eastern District of Oklahoma (in case citations, E.D. Okla. or E.D. Ok.) is a federal court in the Tenth Circuit (except for patent claims and claims against the U.S. government under the Tucker Act, which are appealed to the Federal Circuit).

The District was established on June 16, 1906, and became operational on November 16, 1907, with Oklahoma achieving statehood.

The court's jurisdiction comprises the following counties: Adair, Atoka, Bryan, Carter, Cherokee, Choctaw, Coal, Haskell, Hughes, Johnston, Latimer, Le Flore, Love, Marshall, McCurtain, McIntosh, Murray, Muskogee, Okfuskee, Okmulgee, Pittsburg, Pontotoc, Pushmataha, Seminole, Sequoyah, and Wagoner.

The court is housed in the Ed Edmondson U.S. Courthouse in Muskogee.

The United States Attorney's Office of the Eastern District of Oklahoma represents the United States in civil and criminal litigation in the court.  the Interim United States Attorney for the district is Christopher Wilson.

History 
Judge Frank Howell Seay, appointed to the court by President Jimmy Carter in 1979, was the first Native American (Seminole) appointed to any U.S. district court.

Current judges 
:

Former judges

Chief judges

Succession of seats

See also 
 Courts of Oklahoma
 List of current United States district judges
 List of United States federal courthouses in Oklahoma

References

External links 
 

Oklahoma, Eastern District
Oklahoma law
Muskogee County, Oklahoma
1906 establishments in Oklahoma Territory
Courthouses in Oklahoma
Courts and tribunals established in 1906